Baker Brook is a civil parish in Madawaska County, New Brunswick, Canada.

For governance purposes it is part of the incorporated rural community of Haut-Madawaska, which is a member of the Northwest Regional Service Commission (NWRSC).

Origin of name
The parish was named for Baker Brook, which took its name from John Baker, an American leader in the Aroostook War.  Baker remained in the area after the boundary settlement assigned the area to New Brunswick.

History
Baker Brook was erected in 1930 from Saint-Hilaire Parish.

In 1946 Baker Brook was affected by the major rewriting of Madawaska County parish boundaries.

Boundaries
Baker Brook Parish is bounded:

on the north by the Quebec provincial border;
on the east, running entirely along land grant lines, starting at the provincial border and running southeasterly then southerly along the eastern line Tier Two of the Michaud Settlement, which straddle the Petit-Reed Road and then the Pinniquine Road, for the first sixteen grants, then easterly to the eastern line of Tier One of Michaud Settlement, then southerly along Tier One, then southeasterly along the northern line of the grant south of the junction of Sisson Road and Paradis Road to the western line of Tier Six of the Riceville Settlement, then northerly along Tier Six to its northernmost corner, then easterly along the northern line of Tier Six, which straddles Richard Road and Guerrette Road, then turning about 1.6 kilometres east of the junction of Guerrette Road and Picard Road and running southerly to the northern line of Tier Two of the Ouellette Settlement, which runs along the southern side of Saint-Germain Road, then easterly to Elias Daigle Road, then southerly to the international border in the Saint John River;
on the south by the international border;
on the west, running almost entirely along grant lines, beginning on the international border at the prolongation of the western line of a grant to Augustine Daigle, nearly a kilometre east of the junction of Route 120 and Route 161, then north-northeasterly and north-northwesterly to the rear line of the Saint John River grants, then easterly along the rear line of river grants to the rear line of grants on the eastern side of Caron Brook, then northerly along the rear line to northernmost corner of the ninth grant, then westerly to the northeastern line of a grant straddling Chemin du Lac, then northwesterly to Chemin du Lac, then northeasterly along the southern line of Range Four the Nadeau Settlement grants, which is inland of the grants along Lac Baker, then northwesterly along the eastern line of Range Four to a point about 550 metres southeast of Baker-Brook River, then southwesterly to the eastern line of Range Five of Nadeau Settlement, a tier of smaller grants also inland of the Lac Baker grants, then northwesterly along Range Five to its end near Baker-Brook River, then southwesterly to the rear line Lac Baker grants, then northwesterly to the provincial border.

Communities
Communities at least partly within the parish. bold indicates an incorporated municipality; italics indicate a name no longer in official use

 Baker-Brook
 Couturier Siding
 Michaud
 Concession-de-Baker-Brook
 Concession-des-Ouellette

 Pinniquine
 Rang-des-Morneault
 Rang-Saint-Joseph
 Val-Lambert
 Val-Nadeau

Bodies of water
Bodies of water at least partly in the parish.
  Baker-Brook River
 Rivière Baker-Brook-Nord
  Saint John River
 Branche à Jerry

Islands
Islands at least partly in the parish.
 Baker Island
 Daigle Island
 Fifth Island
 Third Island
 Turtle Island

Other notable places
Parks, historic sites, and other noteworthy places at least partly in the parish.
 Baker Brook Protected Natural Area

Demographics
Parish population total did not include former village of Baker-Brook. 2016 is the last year the parish was profiled in the census.

Population

Language

See also
List of parishes in New Brunswick

Notes

References

Parishes of Madawaska County, New Brunswick
Local service districts of Madawaska County, New Brunswick